This is a list of highest-certified singles in Australia according to the Australian Recording Industry Association (ARIA). Since 1983, ARIA certifies a single Platinum for shipment of 70,000 copies across Australia. Single figures can include "qualifying streams" since July 2015. Since March 2022 this also includes Official Content streams on YouTube. According to the ARIA rules, a "single" is a product that may include up to five songs, thus including various EPs, which are also listed here.

All singles in this list must have won at least 10× ARIA Platinum Awards (700,000 copies). Prior to 1989, the values of the certifications were different, and a dearth of published data has made it difficult to source earlier release numbers.

Highest-certified singles in Australia

Entries by artist
Only eleven artists have achieved two or more songs certified 10× Platinum or higher in Australia. The following list includes works as lead artist and as featured artist.

See also

 Australian Recording Industry Association
 List of best-selling albums in Australia

References

Australia
Australian music-related lists